Kola Bhaskar (died 4 November 2020) was an Indian film editor.

Personal life
His son Balakrishna Kola made his acting debut with Maalai Naerathu Mayakkam (2016).

Death
He died on November 4, 2020

Notable filmography

As producer
 Maalai Nerathu Mayakkam (Tamil, 2016)

As editor
 Kushi – (Telugu, 2001)
 7G Rainbow Colony - (Tamil / Telugu, 2004)
 Oru Kalluriyin Kathai - (Tamil, 2005)
 Pudhupettai - (Tamil, 2006)
 Kedi - (Tamil, 2006)
 Pokkiri - (Tamil, 2007)
 Aadavari Matalaku Arthale Verule - (Telugu, 2007)
 Yaaradi Nee Mohini - (Tamil, 2008)
 Villu - (Tamil, 2009)
 Kanden Kadhalai - (Tamil, 2009)
 Aayirathil Oruvan - (Tamil, 2010)
 Kutty - (Tamil, 2010)
 Mayakkam Enna - (Tamil, 2011)
 3 - (Tamil, 2012)
 Irandam Ulagam - (Tamil, 2013)
 Thilagar - (Tamil, 2015)

References

External links
 

Telugu film editors
Tamil film editors
Year of birth missing
2020 deaths
Film editors from Andhra Pradesh
People from Chittoor district